This is a partial List of films set in Puerto Rico; either the movie's plot includes that island, the movie has been filmed there, or both.  Certain movies that are supposed to be set in Cuba are filmed in Puerto Rico because of the U.S. embargo and similarities between both islands. To learn more about the films of Puerto Rico, see Cinema of Puerto Rico.

#
"4 Estrella" (filmed in Guaynabo)
12 Horas
22 Jump Street (filmed in San Juan)

A
Act of Valor
The Adventurers
After Twenty Years: Puerto Rico (1918)
Aloma of the South Seas
Un Amante Anda Suelto (1969)
Amistad (filmed in San Juan)
Amnesia (2006)
Ángel (a Jacobo Morales film, not related to the U.S. television series)
Angelito Mio
El Anillo
Assassins (filmed in San Juan)
Au Pair 3
Una Aventura Llamada Menudo

B
Back in the Day
Bad Boys II (set in Cuba but filmed in Puerto Rico)
Bananas
Barricada
Battle of Blood Island
Bazooka: Las Batallas de Wilfredo Gómez (documentary on legendary Puerto Rican boxer Wilfredo Gómez)
Behind Enemy Lines: Colombia
El Beso que me Diste
Brenda Starr
Broche de Oro

C
La Caja de Problemas
The Caller
Caña Brava
El Cantante, starring Marc Anthony and Jennifer Lopez
La Chica del lunes
El Clown
Captain Ron
Captain America: Civil War
Casi Casi
Castro's Daughter
Cat Chaser (an Abel Ferrara film, with Puerto Rico substituting for the Dominican Republic)
Cayo
Che!
Che 1ep
Chiringa
Chona, la puerca asesina (a television movie produced by Sunshine Logroño)
Christian y Cristal
Christmas in Paradise
Chrysalis (El Yunque, PR)
El Cimarrón
Las Combatientes (television movie, winner of the Spirit of Moondance Award at the Moondance Film Festival, starring Alba Nydia Díaz)
Command Approved
Commandments
Con la Musica por Dentro
Conexión Caribe
Contact (radar scene filmed in Arecibo)
Coralito Tiene Dos Maridos
Corazon Salvaje
Correa Cotto, starring Pedro Cabrera and Arturo Correa
Creature from the Haunted Sea
El Crimen de la Hacienda
Cuando Acaba la Noche
El cuento del Gallo Pelon
Culebra
El Curandero del Pueblo

D
De la Mano de un Angel
Death Academy
The Delta Factor
El Derecho de Comer, starring Lissette
Desamores
El Dia que Llegaron
Los Diaz de Doris
Die Mexico Connection
Digger 3D
Dinero Sangre
Dios Los Cria by Jacobo Morales
Dios Los Cria II (2004) by Jacobo Morales
Dirty Dancing: Havana Nights (2004) (set in Cuba, but filmed in Puerto Rico)
The Disappearance of Garcia Lorca
Do Over, The
Doña Ana

E

Elmendof
Enredando Sombras (documentary on Latin American cinema, with a segment by Jacobo Morales)
Entre los Dioses del Desprecio
El Escuadron del Panico
El Tesoro del Yunque
Executive Decision
Los Expatriados

F
The Face at the Window
El Falso Heredero
Fascination
Fascination Amour, starring Andy Lau
Fast Five
Feel The Noise
La Fiebre del Deseo
Flesh Wounds
Flight of Fancy
Flight of the Lost Balloon
The Food of the Gods
For the Love or Country (The Arturo Sandoval Story)
Frankenstein Meets the Spacemonster
Frankie, Desde la Calle
Fray Dolar
Frente al Destino
The Frogmen

G
Gitmo
GoldenEye (radio telescope scene filmed in Arecibo, beach and US Marines ambush scenes filmed in Manati, Puerto Rico, BMW and plane exchange scene filmed in Vega Baja)
Guitarra Mia (documentary and tribute to José Feliciano)

H
Heartbreak Ridge (filmed in Vieques) representing Grenada.
Helen Can Wait
Héroes de Otra Patria
Una Historia Comun
The Hoax (filmed in San Juan, Fajardo, and Rio Grande)
Hola Gente, Hola Mundo, musical and ecological documentary filmed between Costa Rica and Puerto Rico

I
I Witness
Illegal Tender
Imprisoned
In The Shadow
Into the Air: A Kiteboarding Experience
Islands in the Stream

J
Jacob's Ladder
La Jaula
El Jibarito Rafael
Juicio contra un Angel
Julia, Todo en Mi
Juntos, In Any Way

K
Kapt'n Raubein aus St. Pauli
"King of Sorrow" (music video) by Sade
Kings of South Beach

L

Ladrones y Mentirosos (also known as Thieves and Liars for the U.S. festival circuit)
Last Flight Out
Last Woman on Earth (a Roger Corman movie)
Libertad Para la Juventud, starring Chucho Avellanet
Life During Wartime
Linda Sara by Jacobo Morales
Lo que le pasó a Santiago by Jacobo Morales, nominated for a Best Foreign Language Film Oscar
Loco por Ellas
Lord of the Flies (filmed in Vieques)
The Losers
Luisa Capetillo: Pasion de Justicia
Luna de Miel en Condominio
Luna de Miel en Puerto Rico

M
Ma Femme Me Quitte
Macbeth (The Caribbean Macbeth)
Machuchal Agente 'O' en New York
The Maiden Hesit (beach scenes)
Maldeamores
La Maldicion de Mi Raza
The Man from O.R.G.Y.
Man With My Face
Manhattan Merengue!
Manuela y Manuel
Maruja, starring Marta Romero and Axel Anderson
Mas Alla del Limite
Maten el Leon
Meant to Be
The Men Who Stare At Goats
Mi Aventura en Puerto Rico
Mi Dia de Suerte
Mi Verano con Amanda
Milagro en Yauco
Millonario a Go Go
Misterio en la isla de los monstruos
Monster Island
La Mujer del Gato
Una Mujer sin Precio

N
Never Say Die
The New Swiss Family Robinson
Nicolas y los Demas by Jacobo Morales
The Noah
Noches Prohibidas

O
Ocho Puertas
One Hot Summer
One Tree Hill – Season 8, Ep. 21
Operacion Tiburon
El Otro Camino
Outside the Law

P
Paging Emma
The Painting (combat jungle scenes)
Los Peloteros
The Perez Family
The Perfect Getaway
La Piel Desnuda
Pirates of the Caribbean: On Stranger Tides (castle scene filmed in El Morro, Old San Juan; tiny island scene filmed in Palominito Island, off the coast of Fajardo)
Preciosa
Princess Protection Program
The Private Navy of Sgt. O'Farrell (the original, 1968)
Prohibido Amar en Nueva York, starring Charytín and Julio Alemán
Puerto Rico
Puerto Rico en Carnaval
The Punisher

Q
Q&A (1990, Sidney Lumet)

R
Replicas
The Reaping 
El Reporte
Romance en Puerto Rico
Ruby
The Rum Diary
Ruptura
Runner Runner

S
Saint of Devil's Island
Santa Cristal
Seeds of Evil
Sex and the College Girl
A Show of Force
Sian Ka'an
The Singer
Slayer
Species
Stiletto
Stop
Stranded
El Sueño del Regreso
Sunstorm
The Survivor

T
Taínos
Talento de Barrio
Tango Bar, starring Raúl Juliá and Valeria Lynch
Tanya's Island
Teen Beach Movie
Thunder Island
Trapped
Los Tres Pecados*Toxic Shark*

U
Una Aventura Llamada Menudo
Under Suspicion
Undercurrent, with Lorenzo Lamas

V
Vanished (Lifetime original movie, set on fictional island of San Carlos)
Via Cruces Playero
La Virgen de la Calle

W
When the Girls Take Over
Weekend Warriors (filmed in Loiza)
Wizards of Waverly Place: The Movie
Wuthering Heights (filmed in Cabo Rojo)

Y
Yellow
Yo Creo en Santa Claus (I believe in Santa Claus), a television movie broadcast by Televicentro, December 25, 2004, and January 1, 2005, produced by Leo Fernandez III, starring Lorel Crespo and Lou Briel
Yo soy Boricua, pa'que tu lo sepas!
El Yugo

See also

 List of films based on location
List of Puerto Rican films

References

Films set in Puerto Rico
Puerto Rico
Films set in Puerto Rico